The Spanish Renaissance was a movement in Spain, emerging from the Italian Renaissance in Italy during the 14th century, that spread to Spain during the 15th and 16th centuries.

This new focus in art, literature, 
quotes and science inspired by the Greco-Roman tradition of Classical antiquity, received a major impulse from several events in 1492:

Unification of the longed-for Christian kingdom with the definitive taking of Granada, the last Islamic controlled territory in the Iberian Peninsula, and the successive expulsions of thousands of Muslim and Jewish believers,
The official discovery of the western hemisphere, the Americas,
The publication of the first grammar of a vernacular European language in print, the Gramática (Grammar) by Antonio de Nebrija.

Historical background

The beginning of the Renaissance in Spain is closely linked to the historical-political life of the monarchy of the Catholic Monarchs. Its figures are the first to leave the medieval approaches that secured a feudal scheme of weak monarch over a powerful and restless nobility. The Catholic Monarchs unite the forces of the incipient state and ally with the principal families of the nobility to maintain their power. One of these families, the Mendoza, use the new style like distinction of its clan and, by extension, of the protection of the monarchy.

Little by little, the novel esthetic was introduced into the rest of the court and the clergy, mixing with purely Iberian styles, like the Nasrid art of the dying kingdom of Granada, the exalted and personal Gothic Castilian queen, and the Flemish tendencies in the official painting of the court and the Church. The assimilation of elements gave way to a personal interpretation of the orthodox Renaissance, which came to be called Plateresque. Therefore, secondary artists were brought in from Italy, apprentices were sent to the Italian shops, they brought designs, architectural plans, books and engravings, paintings, etc., of which portraits, themes and composition were copied.

King Charles I was more predisposed to the new art, paradoxically called the old way, remitted to the Classical antiquity. His direct patronage achieved some of the most beautiful works of the special and unique Spanish Renaissance style: the patronage of Almazan de Covarrubias, his commissions for Titian, who never agreed to relocate to Spain. Painters of great quality were, far from the courtier nucleus, Pedro Berruguete, Juan de Juanes, Paolo da San Leocadio, of whom the delicate Virgin of the Caballero de Montesa is highlighted, Yáñez de la Almazan and Gerardo de los Llanos.

The painting of the Spanish Renaissance is normally completed in oil. It realizes interiors perfectly subject to the laws of perspective, without over-emphasis of the people. The figures are all of the same size and anatomically correct.

The colors and the shading are applied in tonal ranges, according to the Italian teachings. To accentuate the Italian style, in addition, it is common to add elements directly copied from it, like the adornments a candelieri (borders of vegetables and cupids that surround the frames), or Roman ruins in the countrysides, including in scenes of the life of Christ.

Literature

Miguel de Cervantes Saavedra, author of El Ingenioso Hidalgo Don Quijote de la Mancha
Jorge Manrique author of the Coplas por la muerte de su padre
Garcilaso de la Vega, poet. 
San Juan de la Cruz and
Santa Teresa de Jesús, mystic poets .
Fernando de Rojas, author of La Celestina
Fray Luis de León
Juan Boscán
Ausiàs March
Alonso de Ercilla, author of La Araucana
Lope de Rueda
Fray Luis de Granada
Marqués de Santillana
Diego Hurtado de Mendoza
Juan Latino, born Juan de Sessa, poet and humanist.
Alonzo de Santa Cruz
Francisco de la Torre
Juan de Valdés
Lucio Marineo Siculo, Sicilian humanist and historian.
Anonymous writers of the Romancero and of the Masterpiece of picaresque literature Vida de Lazarillo de Tormes

Painting and sculpture

Painters

Pedro Berruguete
Alonso Berruguete
Alonso Cano
Juan de Flandes
Fernando Gallego
El Greco
Luis de Morales
Juan Pantoja de la Cruz
Alonso Sánchez Coello
Sofonisba Anguissola
Fernando Yáñez de la Almedina
Bartolomé González y Serrano
Diego Velázquez

Paintings

The Burial of the Count of Orgaz by El Greco
The Nobleman with his Hand on his Chest by El Greco
Laocoön by El Greco
Annunciation by Pedro Berruguete
Pieta by Fernando Gallego
Portrait of Isabel Clara Eugenia by Alonso Sánchez Coello
Virgin of the Milk or Virgin with Child (Luis de Morales).

Sculptors

Juan de Ancheta
Gaspar Becerra
Alonso Berruguete
Felipe Bigarny
Damià Forment
Esteban Jordán
Juan de Juni
Bartolomé Ordóñez
Diego Siloe

Architecture

Juan de Herrera
Juan Bautista de Toledo
Gil de Hontañón
Diego Siloe 
Enrique Egas
Alonso de Covarrubias
Pedro Machuca
Andrés de Vandelvira
Diego de Riaño
Juan de Álava
Hernán Ruiz the Younger

Music

Arpa de dos ordenes (Spanish cross-strung harp)
Juan de Anchieta
Antonio de Cabezón (organist)
Juan del Encina (also poet and playwright)
Bartolomé de Escobedo
Juan de Esquivel Barahona
Juan Pérez de Gijón
Francisco Guerrero
Mateo Flecha
Alonso Lobo
Luis de Milán (vihuelist)
Cristóbal de Morales
Alonso Mudarra
Juan Navarro
Diego Ortiz
Francisco de Peñalosa
Joan Pau Pujol
Melchior Robles
Francisco de Salinas (theorist)
Tomás de Santa María
Francisco de la Torre
Juan de Triana
Juan Vásquez
Tomás Luis de Victoria
Sebástian de Vivanco
Luis de Narvaez

Science
Miguel Servet
School of Salamanca
Jerónimo Muñoz
Fernán Pérez de Oliva

See also

Spanish art
Renaissance of the 12th century
Portuguese Renaissance
Al-Andalus

References

 
16th century in Spain